Sportivo Tarapacá Ferrocarril was a Peruvian football club, located in the city of Lima. The club was founded with the name of club Sportivo Tarapacá Ferrocarril and played in Primera Division Peruana from 1926 until 1937. The club was runner-up of the national tournament in 1926. In 1937, Sportivo Tarapacá Ferrocarril was relegated and it was their last appearance in the Primera Division Peruana.

Achievements
Primera División Peruana: 0
 Runner-up (1): 1926
 Third Place (1): 1918

See also
List of football clubs in Peru
Peruvian football league system

External links
 RSSSF - Peru - List of Champions
 Peruvian football seasons

Football clubs in Lima